Events from the year 1856 in Germany.

Incumbents
 King of Bavaria – Maximilian II
 King of Hanover – George V
 King of Prussia – Frederick William IV
 King of Saxony – John of Saxony

Events 
 August – Pre-human remains are found in the Neander Valley in Prussia .

Births 
 January 6 – Martin von Feuerstein, German painter (d. 1931)
 January 31 – Hermann von François, German general (d. 1933)
 February 12 – Eduard von Böhm-Ermolli, Austrian general, German field marshal (d. 1941)
 February 15 – Emil Kraepelin, German psychiatrist (d. 1926)
 February 17 – Arnold von Winckler, German general (d. 1945)

 July 7 – Georg von der Marwitz, German general (d. 1929)
 September 18 – Wilhelm von Gloeden, German photographer (d. 1931)
 November 16 – Jürgen Kröger, German architect (d. 1928)
 November 29 – Theobald von Bethmann Hollweg, Chancellor of Germany (d. 1921)
 
 December 25 – Hans von Bartels, German painter (d. 1913)

Deaths 

 February 17 – Heinrich Heine, German writer (b. 1797)
 June 26 – Max Stirner, German philosopher (b. 1806)

 July 29 -Robert Schumann , German composer, pianist (b. 1810 )

Years of the 19th century in Germany
Germany
Germany